Bob Smith Junior, also known as Diabolo Man, is a Ghanaian veteran actor, producer director and writer. He was known for various roles he played in movies like Diabolo and Mamma Mia.

Filmography
Diabolo
Mamma Mia
Coming To Ghana
Sika Mu Sakawa

See also 

 Eddie Coffie

References

Living people
Year of birth missing (living people)
Ghanaian male film actors
21st-century Ghanaian male actors